This article is about the particular significance of the year 1830 to Wales and its people.

Incumbents
Lord Lieutenant of Anglesey – Henry Paget, 1st Marquess of Anglesey 
Lord Lieutenant of Brecknockshire – Henry Somerset, 6th Duke of Beaufort
Lord Lieutenant of Caernarvonshire – Peter Drummond-Burrell, 22nd Baron Willoughby de Eresby 
Lord Lieutenant of Cardiganshire – William Edward Powell
Lord Lieutenant of Carmarthenshire – George Rice, 3rd Baron Dynevor 
Lord Lieutenant of Denbighshire – Sir Watkin Williams-Wynn, 5th Baronet    
Lord Lieutenant of Flintshire – Robert Grosvenor, 1st Marquess of Westminster 
Lord Lieutenant of Glamorgan – John Crichton-Stuart, 2nd Marquess of Bute 
Lord Lieutenant of Merionethshire – Sir Watkin Williams-Wynn, 5th Baronet
Lord Lieutenant of Montgomeryshire – Edward Clive, 1st Earl of Powis (until 20 November; Edward Herbert, 2nd Earl of Powis (from 20 November)
Lord Lieutenant of Pembrokeshire – Sir John Owen, 1st Baronet
Lord Lieutenant of Radnorshire – George Rodney, 3rd Baron Rodney

Bishop of Bangor – Henry Majendie (until 9 July); Christopher Bethell (from 28 October) 
Bishop of Llandaff – Edward Copleston 
Bishop of St Asaph – John Luxmoore (until 31 January)William Carey (from 12 November) 
Bishop of St Davids – John Jenkinson

Events
February 23 - William Carey becomes Bishop of St Asaph.
April 23 - John Montgomery Traherne marries Charlotte Louisa Talbot, daughter of Thomas Mansel Talbot of Margam.
September 1 - In the 1830 United Kingdom general election, Christopher Rice Mansel Talbot is elected for Glamorganshire as a Whig; he will continue to sit for a Glamorganshire constituency until his death in 1890.
The Penydarren works at Merthyr Tydfil produce the rails for the world's first steam railway.
The Plymouth ironworks produces over 12,000 tons of bar-iron, compared with 7,941 tons ten years earlier.
Sir Thomas Frankland Lewis is appointed Treasurer of the Navy by the Duke of Wellington.

Arts and literature

New books
Ellis Evans - Anogaeth i Athrawon ac Athrawesau ein Hysgolion Sabothol
Felicia Hemans - Songs of the Affections
Benjamin Jones (PA Môn) - Athrawiaeth Bedydd (1830)
Sir Samuel Rush Meyrick - Engraved Illustrations of Antient Arms and Armour, from the Collection at Goodrich Court

Music
Thomas Griffiths (Tau Gimel) - Casgliad o Hymnau

Births
23 January - Thomas Lloyd-Mostyn, politician (d. 1861)
22 April - Sarah Emily Davies, educator (d. 1921)
May - Richard Davies (Tafolog), poet and critic (d. 1904)
25 May - Robert Williams (Trebor Mai), poet (d. 1877)
2 June - Sir John Henry Puleston, banker and politician (d. 1908)

Deaths
12 January - Owen Davies, Wesleyan Methodist leader
31 January - John Luxmoore, Bishop of St Asaph, 64
26 June - King George IV of the United Kingdom, formerly the second longest-serving Prince of Wales (1762–1820), 67
9 July - Henry William Majendie, Bishop of Bangor
18 November - John Howell (Ioan ab Hywel or Ioan Glandyfroedd), poet
29 November - James Humphreys, lawyer, about 62

References

 
Wales